Mthokozisi Khathi (born  August 24, 1976), professionally known by his stage name DJ Tira, is a South African DJ, record producer and Kwaito artist.  He helped popularize the Gqom music genre.  

Khathi won the Smirnoff SA DJ Knockout competition in 2000 and released the compilation album "Real Makoya" in 2001. He is a member of the South African musical group, Durbans Finest. Tira signed a record deal with Kalawa Jazmee in 2005 and established his own record  label Afrotaiment in 2007. His debut album  Ezase Afro Vol:1 (2008), was a commercial success.

Tira's fourth album 21 Years Of DJ Tira (2020) was certified platinum by the Recording Industry of South Africa (RISA). The album included chart-topping singles "Nguwe" and "Uyandazi". His fifth studio album Rockstar Forever (2021) debut number one on iTunes.

Early life 
Khathi was born in KwaHlabisa Village, KwaZulu-Natal, and his family relocated to Durban in 1979. Khathi attended Mlokothwa High School and enrolled at the University of Natal now known as UKZN in 1995, studying human resources.

Career 
Khathi developed an interest in being a DJ while he was at university, when he started playing as a DJ in 1996. Around 2001, he released his first record named Real Makoya, which is a compilation album with DJ Khabzela. In 2005, he was signed a record deal with Kalawa Jazzmee. He formed a group named Tzozo En Professor and later formed Durbans Finest together with DJ Sox which also was under Kalawa Jazmee Records.   Tira and Sox together released a series compilation albums named Durbans Finest.

In 2007, he launched his recording studio Afrotainment and signed DJ Cndo as the first artist on his record label. Since he was working at his own production, he became a music producer. Later the same year DJ Tira signed kwaito group Big Nuz after they relocated from Johannesburg to Durban. In 2008, DJ Tira as a featured artist appeared on two tracks on urban radio charts and music shops charts alongside of Big Nuz's "Ubala Lolo" and DJ Clock's "Mahamba Yedwa".

In 2008, he released his first solo project under his record label named Ezase Afro Vol:1. The album is supported by the guest appearance of Bricks, Daddy, Big Nuz and Joocy of Afrosoul. Ezase Afro Vol:1 became a hit album and sold more than 20 000 copies.

In March 2019, his single "Amachankura" featuring TNS was released as the lead single from an upcoming studio album. In July 2019, the second single "Thank You Mr DJ" featuring Joocy was released. Tira released Ikhenani on September 13, 2019. Ikhenani won Best Kwaito Album  at the 26th ceremony of South African Music Awards.

On August 24, 2020, his fourth studio album 21 Years of DJ Tira was released in South Africa, celebrating  a 21 years in music industry. The album was certified platinum by the Recording industry of South Africa  (RiSA).

In March 2021, he co-hosted season 6 of the SABC 1 talent show competition, 1's and 2's.

On June 25, 2021, his fifth studio album Rockstar Forever was released in South Africa. The album features the Q Twins, Makhadzi, Western Boyz, Jumbo, Prince Bulo, Biza Wethu, Mampintsha, Joocy, Ntencane, Proffesor, Beast, Worst Behaviour, Dladla Mshunqisi, BlaQRythm, Mtebza & Khazozo. Rockstar  Forever rank number 1 on iTunes charts South Africa.

Personal life
DJ Tira is married to Gugu Khathi and they have two sons and one daughter. DJ Tira and his wife hosted a Umabo (traditional Zulu ceremony) at his home in KwaHlabisa, KwaZulu-Natal.

Discography

List of studio albums

Compilation albums

Awards and nominations

References

External links 

1976 births
Living people
People from Big Five Hlabisa Local Municipality
Zulu people
Musicians from KwaZulu-Natal
South African musicians
South African record producers
South African DJs